Mohamed Bach Hamba (1881-1920) was a Tunisian nationalist writer and one of the leaders of the Young Tunisians. He was the editor of the "Revue du Maghreb", a monthly magazine, which demanded reforms under French rule.

Biography
Mohamed Bach Hamba was born in 1881 into a family of Turkish origin; his brother, Ali Bach Hamba, was a co-founder of the Young Tunisians. After travelling in Constantinople, in May 1916, Bach Hamba launched the nationalist "Revue du Maghreb" in Geneva. This monthly magazine aimed at calling for reforms in Tunisia and Algeria, amounting to equality for all under French rule. However, copies that were sent to Tunisia were often confiscated due to its strong criticisms of the existing colonial order. The magazine, which was subsidised by Turkey, also went further and called for self-determination. In 1918, Bach Hamba published a memoir under the title "Le Peuple algéro-tunisien et la France" where he denounced the policy of "participation" with the French Protectorate and argues for the independence of the Algerian-Tunisian people. He died on 27 December 1920, and was buried in the cemetery of Hasenheide southeast of Berlin.

Publications
 Le Peuple algéro-tunisien et la France (1918)

References

Bibliography 

 .
 .
 .
 

1881 births
1920 deaths
Tunisian people of Turkish descent
Tunisian academics
Tunisian nationalists
Tunisian writers